C'est quoi la vie? is a 1999 French drama film directed by François Dupeyron. The film received two nominations at the César Awards 2000 and won Most Promising Actor for Éric Caravaca.

Cast 
 Éric Caravaca - Nicolas
 Jacques Dufilho - Noël, le grand-père
 Jean-Pierre Darroussin - Marc, le père
 Isabelle Renauld - Maria
 Michelle Goddet - Monique
 Claudine Mavros - Laure
 Elie Tazartes - Patty
 Licino Da Silva - Rémy
 Julie-Anne Roth - Pauline
 Yves Verhoeven - Bruno

External links 

1999 drama films
1999 films
French drama films
Films directed by François Dupeyron
Films about farmers
1990s French films
1990s French-language films